If Beale Street Could Talk is a 1974 novel by American writer James Baldwin. His fifth novel (and 13th book overall), it is a love story set in Harlem in the early 1970s. The title is a reference to the 1916 W.C. Handy blues song "Beale Street Blues", named after Beale Street in Downtown Memphis, Tennessee.

It was adapted as a film of the same name, written and directed by Barry Jenkins, and it garnered an Academy Award for Best Supporting Actress for Regina King. The film was released theatrically on December 14, 2018.

Summary
The book follows a relationship between a 19-year-old girl named Tish, whose given name is Clementine Rivers, and a 22-year-old sculptor named Fonny, whose given name is Alonzo Hunt. They grew up in the same neighborhood in New York City and are childhood friends. They fall in love and become engaged. But when Tish is 21, Fonny is falsely accused of raping a woman, and arrested and jailed awaiting his trial. Tish learns that she is pregnant after Fonny is incarcerated and must rely on her and Fonny's family for support. The failures of the criminal justice system keep Fonny incarcerated. 

Beale Street is the first Baldwin novel to focus exclusively on a Black love story; it is also the only novel in his corpus narrated by a woman. Published at the tail end of the Black Arts Movement, it explores love within Black life, centering on the emotional bonds holding two African American families together.

Critical reception
Reviewing the novel in The New York Times in 1974, the novelist Joyce Carol Oates described the book as "a moving, painful story" but "ultimately optimistic. It stresses the communal bond between members of an oppressed minority, especially between members of a family," offering 
"a quite moving and very traditional celebration of love. It affirms not only love between a man and a woman, but love of a type that is dealt with only rarely in contemporary fiction--that between members of a family, which may involve extremes of sacrifice."

Anatole Broyard, also writing for The New York Times, was less sanguine. Deeming the novel a "sentimental love story," he writes,
I get the feeling that Mr. Baldwin doesn't worry overmuch about the authenticity of his books. He knows that, with all his faults, a sizable proportion of the American public will love him still. He is a brand name by now. In fact, he is so dated—I think even Richard Wright is more contemporary—that he might even qualify for our current nostalgia craze. An urbanized "Perils of Pauline," his book could make it equally well as a "gothic" novel, sending thrills of synthetic terror down the spine of that legendary old lady in Dubuque.

In 2015, Stacia L. Brown, writing in Gawker, similarly found Beale Street "belong[ed] to a collection of literature that seeks to humanize black men, through their relationships with parents, lovers, siblings, and children. It swan-dives from optimism to bleakness and rises from the ash of dashed hopes."

When Baldwin spoke to Hugh Hebert of The Guardian upon the release of Beale Street in 1974, he said about his work: "Every poet is an optimist... But on the way to that optimism 'you have to reach a certain level of despair to deal with your life at all.'"

Film adaptation

Barry Jenkins wrote and directed the film adaptation of the novel, starring KiKi Layne as Tish and Stephan James as Fonny, with Regina King (who won an Academy Award for her role). The adaptation was produced by Plan B Entertainment, and was screened at the St. Louis International Film Festival in November 2018. Annapurna Pictures released the film on December 14, 2018.

References

1974 American novels
American novels adapted into films
Novels by James Baldwin
Novels set in Manhattan
Harlem in fiction
Fiction set in the 1970s
African-American novels